Zindagi is a 1964 Indian Hindi-language film produced by S. S. Vasan, Gemini Pictures and  directed by Ramanand Sagar. The film stars Rajendra Kumar, Vyjayanthimala, Raaj Kumar, Prithviraj Kapoor, Mehmood, Jayant, Jeevan, Leela Chitnis and Helen. The film's music is by Shankar Jaikishan. The film was remade in Tamil as Vaazhkai Padagu (1965) and in Telugu as Aada Brathuku (1965).

Plot
Beena works as a stage actress and lives a poor lifestyle with her widowed mother. One day while returning home, she is molested by Banke and two other men, but Rajan comes to her rescue. He escorts her home and soon both of them fall in love with each other. Rajan's father, Rai Bahadur Gangasaran, is wealthy and does not approve of Beena at all. But when Rajan threatens to leave him, he changes his mind and permits them to get married. After the marriage, they settle down to a harmonious life and soon Beena becomes pregnant. One night while driving, Rajan gets a flat tire, he leaves Beena in the car in order to get help. When he returns Beena has disappeared. She returns home the next day, and everyone is relieved to have her back. A few days later, they get the news that Gopal, the Manager of the Theatre that Beena used to work with, has been arrested and charged with killing a man named Ratanlal. Gangasaran is on the jury and would like Gopal to get a fair trial. The police find out that a woman was present with Gopal at the night of the murder, but Gopal refuses to divulge her name. As a result of this refusal, he is found guilty. When the sentence is about to be passed, Beena suddenly appears in Court and testifies that she was with Gopal the night of the murder. Gopal is set free, but Beena is shunned by Rajan and Gangasaran and not only driven out of the house, but also from the town. The question does remain - what compelled Beena to spend the night with Gopal, and why was Gopal accused of killing Ratanlal?

Cast 
 Rajendra Kumar as Rajendra "Rajan"
 Vyjayanthimala as Beena
 Raaj Kumar as Gopal
 Prithviraj Kapoor as Rai Bahadur Gangasaran
 Mehmood as Jaggu
 Helen as Chameli
 Jayant as Sher Khan
 Jeevan as Banke
 Kanhaiyalal as Pandit
 Dhumal as Chameli's Father
 Leela Chitnis as Beena's Mother
 Mumtaz Begum as Jaggu's Mother
 Pushpavalli
 Baby Farida

Soundtrack

References

External links 
 

1964 films
Indian drama films
1960s Hindi-language films
Films scored by Shankar–Jaikishan
Films directed by Ramanand Sagar
Hindi films remade in other languages
Gemini Studios films
1964 drama films
Hindi-language drama films